Matter Fixed is the first album by the English singer, Marlon Roudette, released on 2 September 2011. The name is a reference to the project he was involved with before starting solo, a duo with Preetesh Hirji called Mattafix.

Singles
On 17 July 2011 Roudette released "Brotherhood of the Broken" for free download as a promotional single from the album. On 20 July he released "New Age" as the first single from the album in Germany for airplay. On 16 August 2011 "New Age" was available on the iTunes Store. The single reached number 1 in Germany, Austria and Switzerland.

The second single from the album was "Riding Home", released as an EP only in the UK. Roudette noted that the third single from the album would be "Anti Hero"; on 20 January 2012 it was released via iTunes in Germany.

Release dates
"Matter Fixed" was released on 2 September 2011 in Austria, Belgium, Slovakia, Denmark, Czech Republic, Germany, Russia, Sweden and Switzerland. On 23 January 2012 it was available in France and in the rest of Europe.

The release in the United Kingdom was delayed until 19 March 2012.

Track listing

Charts

Riding Home

On 24 October 2011, after signing with the Warner Music Group record label for the UK, Roudette released an EP in the UK named Riding Home, with four tracks from Matter Fixed. It failed to enter the UK Singles Chart.

Track listing

References

External links
 Marlon Roudette's official website.
 Marlon Roudette on Facebook.
 Marlon Roudette on Twitter.
 Marlon Roudette's official YouTube channel.

2011 debut albums
Marlon Roudette albums